Ukrainsky is a rural locality (a khutor) and the administrative center of Aleynikovskoye Rural Settlement, Rossoshansky District, Voronezh Oblast, Russia. The population was 536 as of 2010. There are 9 streets.

Geography 
Ukrainsky is located 15 km northeast of Rossosh (the district's administrative centre) by road. Babki is the nearest rural locality.

References 

Rural localities in Rossoshansky District